Tharlam Monastery is a Tibetan Buddhist monastery of the Sakya sect in Boudhanath, Kathmandu, Nepal.

History
In 1436, Ga Rabjampa Kunga Yeshe (1397 - 1470) founded Tharlam Monastery in Kham, Eastern Tibet. It was also known as Tarlam Sabzang Namgyaling, 唐隆寺, 汤陇寺, tanglong si, and Śrī Tarlam Ganden Sabzang Namgyel Ling (thar lam dga' ldan sa bzang rnam rgyal gling).

In 1959 the monastery was destroyed by Chinese communists. The monastery was rebuilt by Dezhung Rinpoche in Kathmandu, Nepal in 1981. 40 rooms for "meditation and retreat" were later built.

References

Religious buildings and structures in Kathmandu
Buddhist monasteries in Nepal
Tourist attractions in Kathmandu
Tibetan Buddhism in Nepal
1981 establishments in Nepal